Peng Liedong (born 20 October 2000) is a Chinese footballer who plays as a midfielder for Zibo Cuju.

Career

He made his debut against Jilin Baijia on 30 April 2019, coming on for Liu Long in the 82nd minute.

In 2022, Peng joined Zibo Cuju. He made his debut against Shijiazhuang Gongfu on 16 June 2022, coming on in the 80th minute for Sun Weizhe.

References

External links

Living people
2000 births
Association football midfielders
Chinese footballers
Qingdao F.C. players
Zibo Cuju F.C. players
China League One players